Venus Trap may refer to:

Venus Flytrap
The Venus Trap, a 1988 German film starring Sonja Kirchberger
The Venus Trap (An Inner Sanctum Mystery), a 1966 mystery novel by James Michael Ullman
Venus Trap, an episode of Garth comic strip